Edward Grimston may refer to:

 Edward Grimston (St Albans MP) (1812–1881), English amateur cricketer and politician who held a seat in the House of Commons from 1835 to 1841
 Edward Grimston (Ipswich MP) (c. 1508–1600), English politician and comptroller of Calais
 Edward Grimston (Harwich MP) (1600–1624), member of parliament for Harwich
 Edward Grimston (diplomat) (died 1478), ambassador of England at the court of Philip the Good, the Duke of Burgundy